The Plane Tree is a 2011 Turkish comedy-drama film, written and directed by Handan İpekçi, featuring Celile Toyon as a retired teacher who is the catalyst for the bi-monthly reunion of her extended family under the titular plane tree. The film, which opened on March 18, 2011 at number 2 in the Turkish box office, is one of the highest grossing Turkish films of 2011.

Release

Reception
The film remained in the Turkish box-office charts for 20 weeks and made a total gross of US$1,562,977.

See also
 Turkish films off 2011
 2011 on film

References

External links
  
 

2011 comedy-drama films
2011 films
Films shot in Turkey
Films set in Istanbul
Turkish comedy-drama films